Albert Cook (1880 – 27 September 1949) was an English footballer who played in the English Football League for Port Vale, Stockport County and Stoke. He also played cricket for Staffordshire.

Football career
Cook played for North Staffs Nomads, before joining Burslem Port Vale in August 1900. He made his debut at centre-half in a 3–1 defeat to West Bromwich Albion at The Hawthorns on 21 September 1901, and went on to play nine Second Division and four FA Cup games in the 1901–02 campaign. He played four league games in the 1902–03 season, and scored his first senior goal on 20 September, in a 3–0 win over Doncaster Rovers at the Athletic Ground. He then featured five times in the 1904–05 campaign and ten times in the 1905–06 campaign, and claimed three goals against Clapton Orient, Glossop, and Hull City. He joined rivals Stoke in February 1906, but featured in just one First Division game in the 1906–07 season, before moving on to Stockport County. He played four Second Division games for the "Hatters", and had a spell with North Staffs Nomads, before he made a brief return to Port Vale. He returned to Stoke in 1908, and played 11 Birmingham & District League games in the 1908–09 season, scoring once against Stourbridge at the Victoria Ground. He returned to Port Vale on a more permanent basis in January 1909, though by then the club had lost their Football League status. Cook enjoyed regular football until he fell out of favour in September 1910 and was released in the summer of 1911.

Cricket career
Cook played cricket for Staffordshire in the 1921 Minor Counties Cricket Championship; his brother, Evans Cook, also played cricket for Staffordshire.

Career statistics
Source:

References

1880 births
1949 deaths
Footballers from Stoke-on-Trent
English footballers
Association football midfielders
Port Vale F.C. players
Stoke City F.C. players
Stockport County F.C. players
English Football League players
English cricketers
Staffordshire cricketers